Carmelita Escio Aguilar-Abalos (born July 2, 1962) is a Filipina politician and the incumbent vice mayor of Mandaluyong since 2022. She previously served as the city's mayor from 2016 to 2022. She is the wife of former MMDA Chairman and current DILG Secretary Benjamin Abalos Jr., whom she succeeded as mayor. She was also a semi-finalist at the Binibining Pilipinas 1981, representing Cavite.

She led the distribution of COVID-19 health recovery kits in Barangka Ilaya.

References

External links
Official Facebook Page of Menchie Abalos

1962 births
Living people
21st-century Filipino politicians
United Nationalist Alliance politicians
PDP–Laban politicians
Filipino women in politics
Mayors of Mandaluyong
Politicians from Metro Manila
Tagalog people